After Sex may refer to:

 After Sex (1997 film), a French drama film that stars Brigitte Roüan and Patrick Chesnais
 After Sex (2001 film), a comedy film that stars Dan Cortese, Virginia Madsen, and Brooke Shields
 After Sex (2007 film), a film that uses sex as a background to examine intimacy